Blanca Andreu (born 1959 A Coruña) is a Spanish poet.

Life
She grew up in Orihuela, where her family still resides, and attended El Colegio de Jesus-Maria de San Agustin, followed by studies in philology in Murcia. At age 20, she moved to Madrid without formally completing her education. Here, she met Francisco Umbral, who introduced her to the literati of the city.

In 1980, she was awarded the Premio Adonáis de Poesía for her work entitled, De una niña de provincias que se vino a vivir en un Chagall. Her use of surrealism is considered the beginning of the Post-Modern Generation. Her later work have tried to shy away from the surrealist tendencies of her early pieces.

In 1985 she married novelist Juan Benet. After he died in 1993, she moved to Alicante and then to A Coruña where she now lives an ordinary life.

Awards
 1980: Premio Adonáis de Poesía
 1981: Premio de Cuentos Gabriel Miró
 1982: Premio Mundial de Poesía Mística, Fernando Rielo
 1982: Premio Ícaro de Literatura
 2001: Premio Internacional de Poesía Laureà Mela

Works
 De una niña de provincias que se vino a vivir en un Chagall (1980)
 Báculo de Babel (1982)
 Capitán Elphistone (1988)
 El sueño oscuro (1994)
 La tierra transparente (2002)

Critical studies
"Blanca Andreu: Recovering the Lost Language", Sylvia Sherno, Hispania, Vol. 77, No. 3 (Sep., 1994), pp. 384-393 
"Between Water and Fire: Blanca Andreu's Dream Landscapes", Sylvia Sherno, Revista Hispánica Moderna, Año 47, No. 2 (Dec., 1994), pp. 533-542

References

External links
Artist's website
Artist's blog

1959 births
Living people
Spanish women poets
People from A Coruña
20th-century Spanish poets
20th-century Spanish women writers